The 18421 / 18422 Puri - Ajmer Express is an express train belonging to Indian Railways East Coast Railway zone that run between  and  in India.

Service 
It operates as train number 18421 from Puri to Ajmer Junction and as train number 18422 in the reverse direction, serving the states of Rajasthan, Gujarat, Maharashtra, Chhattisgarh & Odisha .

Coaches

The 18421 / 22 Puri–Ajmer Junction  Express has one AC 2-tier,  three AC 3-tier, nine sleeper class, seven general unreserved & two SLR (seating with luggage rake) coaches . It carries a pantry car.

As with most train services in India, coach composition may be amended at the discretion of Indian Railways depending on demand.

Route & Halts

Traction

References

External links
18421 Puri Ajmer Junction Express at India Rail Info
18422 Ajmer Junction Puri Express at India Rail Info

Express trains in India
Rail transport in Rajasthan
Rail transport in Gujarat
Rail transport in Maharashtra
Rail transport in Chhattisgarh
Rail transport in Odisha
Transport in Puri
Transport in Ajmer